Herbert Hunter may refer to:
Herbert B. Hunter (1890–1976), architect in North Carolina
Herbert Hunter (footballer), see 1906–07 Crystal Palace F.C. season
Herb Hunter (footballer) (1881–1915), Australian rules footballer and athlete
Herb Hunter (1895–1970), baseball player